Simão Robison Oliveira Jatene is the former Governor of the Brazilian state of Pará.

References

1949 births
Governors of Pará
Living people
People from Belém
Brazilian people of Lebanese descent